Bréauté is a commune in the Seine-Maritime department in the Normandy region in northern France.

Geography

Heraldry

Population

Places of interest
 The eighteenth-century château d’Anteville.
 The church of St. Georges, with parts dating from the eleventh century.

See also
Communes of the Seine-Maritime department
Falkes de Bréauté

References

Communes of Seine-Maritime